Dirk E. Deaton (born 1994) is an American politician serving as a member of the Missouri House of Representatives from the 159th district. He assumed office in 2019.

Early life and education 
Deaton is a native of Noel, Missouri. He attended Crowder College and Missouri Southern State University before earning a Bachelor of Science degree in interdisciplinary studies from Liberty University.

Career 
Deaton was a member of the McDonald County Republican Club and co-founded the Noel Betterment Association. He was elected to the Missouri House of Representatives in 2018 and assumed office in 2019. Deaton also serves as vice chair of the House Budget Committee and chair of the House Subcommittee on Appropriations for Health, Mental Health, and Social Services.

References 

Living people
1994 births
People from McDonald County, Missouri
Missouri Republicans
Liberty University alumni
Members of the Mississippi House of Representatives